Laosepilysta flavolineata is a species of beetle in the family Cerambycidae, and the only species in the genus Laosepilysta. It was described by Breuning in 1964.

References

Apomecynini
Beetles described in 1964
Monotypic beetle genera